Hurstbourne is a home rule-class city in Jefferson County, Kentucky, United States. The population was 4,216 at the 2010 census, up from 3,884 at the time of the 2000 U.S. census. It is part of the Louisville Metro Government.

History

The land of the present city was part of a military grant to Henry Harrison. It was surveyed by John Floyd in 1774 and first settled by Maj. William Linn, who erected Linn's Station along Beargrass Creek in 1779. It was probably located along the east side of what is now Hurstbourne Parkway and at the time formed a part of the road from the Falls of the Ohio to Fort Harrod. The victims of the 1781 Long Run Massacre were on their way to this site from Squire Boone's Station when they were attacked by Indians and British soldiers. Finding their claim to the land's title questionable, Linn's heirs abandoned the site in the 1790s.

In 1789, however, Colonel Richard Anderson purchased  of land in the area and established his estate under the name "Soldier's Retreat". His house suffered damage in the 1811 earthquake, was struck by lightning, and was demolished in the 1840s. By 1842, John Jeremiah Jacob owned the property and erected Lyndon Hall, now part of the Hurstbourne Country Club's clubhouse.

In 1915, the Hert family acquired the property and renamed it "Hurstbourne". Hurstbourne Parkway was created in 1935 when an earlier lane was widened. By 1965, the property was called "Highbaugh Farms" and, owing to the expansion of Louisville, commercial and residential development began. It incorporated as a city in 1982 to prevent its annexation by Louisville. Almost all of the available land inside the city's limits was developed by 1990.

Development in the 1970s, however, rediscovered the ruins of the Anderson house, which was excavated and rebuilt by local developer Leroy Highbaugh Jr. He moved his family into the rebuilt Soldier's Retreat in 1983, and it now forms a local landmark.

Geography
Hurstbourne is located in east-central Jefferson County at  (38.240235, -85.592599).

Hurstbourne is bounded by Shelbyville Road (U.S. Route 60) to its north, Hurstbourne Parkway to its east, I-64 to its south, and Oxmoor Farm and Oxmoor Center to its west. Neighboring cities include Lyndon and Bellemeade to the north, and Jeffersontown to the east. The area surrounding the intersection of I-64 and Hurstbourne Parkway can be considered an edge city to Louisville, with office parks, shopping centers, and an industrial park all concentrated within a few blocks of the parkway, and residential neighborhoods further off, all on land that was largely undeveloped 40 years earlier.

Demographics

As of the census of 2000, there were 3,884 people, 1,699 households, and 1,199 families residing in the city. The racial makeup of the city was 91.45% White, 3.01% African American, 0.10% Native American, 4.25% Asian, 0.23% from other races, and 0.95% from two or more races. Hispanic or Latino of any race were 1.08% of the population.

There were 1,699 households, out of which 22.0% had children under the age of 18 living with them, 65.7% were married couples living together, 3.6% had a female householder with no husband present, and 29.4% were non-families. 27.7% of all households were made up of individuals, and 17.1% had someone living alone who was 65 years of age or older. The average household size was 2.29 and the average family size was 2.78.

In the city, the population was spread out, with 18.4% under the age of 18, 4.3% from 18 to 24, 16.7% from 25 to 44, 36.8% from 45 to 64, and 23.8% who were 65 years of age or older. The median age was 51 years. For every 100 females, there were 87.8 males. For every 100 females age 18 and over, there were 82.9 males.

The median income for a household in the city was $88,972, and the median income for a family was $106,450. Males had a median income of $98,616 versus $35,029 for females. The per capita income for the city was $49,328. About 1.3% of families and 3.1% of the population were below the poverty line, including 1.9% of those under age 18 and 6.1% of those age 65 or over.

References

External links
City of Hurstbourne official website

Cities in Kentucky
Cities in Jefferson County, Kentucky
Louisville metropolitan area
Populated places established in 1965
1789 establishments in Virginia
1965 establishments in Kentucky